Grady Alderman (December 10, 1938 – April 5, 2018) was an American football player and executive.  He played professionally as an offensive tackle for 16 seasons in the National Football League (NFL), mostly with the Minnesota Vikings.

Career
Alderman played in three Super Bowls and was selected to six Pro Bowls. He ended his pro career with the Chicago Bears, as a player then coach.  He is also noted for being the "last of the original Vikings."  From March 1981 until December 1982 he was the general manager of the Denver Broncos.

Alderman was also a certified public accountant.

Alderman died on April 5, 2018 at the age of 79.

In 2021, the Professional Football Researchers Association named Alderman to the PFRA Hall of Very Good Class of 2021

References

1938 births
2018 deaths
American football offensive guards
American football offensive tackles
Denver Broncos executives
Detroit Lions players
Detroit Titans football players
Minnesota Vikings announcers
Minnesota Vikings players
National Football League announcers
National Football League general managers
Western Conference Pro Bowl players
People from Madison Heights, Michigan
Players of American football from Detroit